Matěj Krajčík (born 19 March 1978) is a former Slovak footballer. He played for the Slovakia national team from 2005 to 2009.

References

External links
 Gambrinus Liga statistics
 

1978 births
Living people
Sportspeople from Trenčín
Slovak footballers
Slovak expatriate footballers
FK Senica players
SK Slavia Prague players
FK Viktoria Žižkov players
MFK Vítkovice players
SK Dynamo České Budějovice players
FK Jablonec players
Reggina 1914 players
Serie A players
Czech First League players
Expatriate footballers in Italy
Slovakia international footballers
Association football defenders